In March 2014, the World Health Organization (WHO) reported a major Ebola outbreak in Guinea, a western African nation, the disease then rapidly spread to the neighboring countries of Liberia and Sierra Leone with smaller outbreaks occurring in Senegal, Nigeria, and Mali; the resulting West African Ebola virus epidemic is the largest Ebola outbreak (cases and deaths) ever documented.

Background

Researchers believe that a 2-year-old boy who lived in the village of Meliandou, Guéckédou Prefecture, Guinea was the index case of the current Ebola virus disease epidemic. The boy died in December 2013. His mother, sister, and grandmother then became ill with similar symptoms and also died. Although Ebola represents a significant public health problem in sub-Saharan Africa and was documented in Tai Forest chimpanzees, only one case had been reported in humans in West Africa. With this background and in the context of poor public health systems, the early cases were mis-diagnosed as diseases more common to the area. Thus Ebola virus disease spread for several months before it was recognized as such. In late October 2014, the boy was later identified as Emile Ouamouno. In a Tuesday, December 30, 2014 online world news story article by Richard Ingham from the Agence France-Presse (AFP) that was featured on the MSN homepage, it was revealed that a tree in the area where children had played at, playing with insect-eating free-tailed bats and hunting and grilling them to eat (they are a cousin of another well-known Ebola reservoir, the fruit bat, whose role in this outbreak is not as clear), is believed to be the point where human infection – likely by the bats – with Ebola in this current outbreak occurred, the 'ground zero' of the epidemic. This is not yet known decisively, but scientists have enough knowledge to go public with the story.

Timeline of reported cases and deaths

Data sources
Data comes from reports by the World Health Organization Global Alert and Response Unit and the WHO's Regional Office for Africa. All numbers are correlated with United Nations Office for the Coordination of Humanitarian Affairs (OCHA), if available. The reports are sourced from official information from the affected countries' health ministries. The WHO has stated the reported numbers "vastly underestimate the magnitude of the outbreak", estimating there may be 3 times as many cases as officially reported.

Understanding the data and its limitations
Each row of the table represents the best available information cross-checked from multiple sources on the day it was reported. The data may be inaccurate for the following reasons:
 Each data source or report may or may not include suspected cases that have not yet been confirmed.
 Each source or report may or may not include probable cases.
 Case numbers may be revised downward if a probable or suspected case is later found to be negative. (Numbers may differ from reports as per respective Government reports. See notes at the bottom for stated source file.)
 The reports usually refer to cumulative data totals since the start of the 2014 epidemic. When new data becomes available or old data is revised the correction could apply either to the past or the present.
 The number of deaths may be revised downwards if it is later found from testing those deaths were not from Ebola.
 There are variable delays in gathering, correcting and reporting the data from multiple sources.
 It is not possible to infer the rate of growth or decline in the spread of the disease from the cumulative data or the graphs; they simply reflect a timeline of the available data as reported on any given date. The real-world spread could be slowing while reported cumulative cases rise at a faster rate due to improved reporting, or the real-world spread could be increasing with flat cumulative data due to lack of reporting.

Graphs

Tables
 For the final numbers, which would include flare-ups please see infobox at West African Ebola virus epidemic

Notes:

 Date is the "as of" date from the reference. A single source may report statistics for multiple "as of" dates.
 Total cases and deaths before 1 July 2014 are calculated.
 Numbers with ≥ may not be consistent due to under reporting.

References

Further reading

External links

Resources

timeline

Disaster timelines
Medicine timelines
2013 timelines
2014 timelines
2015 timelines
2016 timelines